The Bapaume Australian Cemetery (French: Cimetière australien de Bapaume) is a military cemetery located in the French commune of Bapaume (Pas-de-Calais). The site is maintained by the Commonwealth War Graves Commission.

History
Bapaume was severely damaged by both sides during World War I.
When the cemetery was established in 1917, the location was close to the 3rd Australian Casualty Clearing Station.

Design
The rectangular site is enclosed by a rubble wall.

Burials
The site includes both Commonwealth and German graves, including 87 identified casualties from World War I.

References
 The War Graves Photographic Project
 Details (Commonwealth War Graves Commission)

External links
 

Cemeteries in Pas-de-Calais
Commonwealth War Graves Commission cemeteries in France
World War I cemeteries in France